Pensioensparen is a form of retirement savings in Belgium in which a person puts aside an amount of money each year for their retirement, in addition to the state pension. In this sense, it is a form of retirement saving akin to individual retirement accounts in the United States.

References 

Economy of Belgium